Pyrgophorus coronatus is a species of very small aquatic snail, an operculate gastropod mollusk or micromollusk in the family Hydrobiidae.

Description

Distribution and habitat
In Nicaragua, it is found in abundance in the volcanic crater lakes Xiloa and Apoyo

References

External links
 http://www.lagunadeapoyo.blogspot.com/2011/03/snails.html

Hydrobiidae
Gastropods described in 1840